Park 12, (also referred to by its Kaurna name Karrawirra, meaning "river red gum forest") is one of the 29 Parks that make up the Adelaide Park Lands. It consists of 55.5 hectares bounded by North Terrace, Frome Road, Sir Edwin Smith Avenue and King William Road

Bisected by the River Torrens, the northern part of the Park contains the University playing fields.

Along North Terrace, the southern part of the Park contains the University of South Australia (City East campus), the University of Adelaide (main campus), the Art Gallery, the Museum, the State Library, the War Memorial, Government House, the Boer War Memorial, the Jubilee 150 Walkway, and numerous statues.

The southern part also contains the Torrens Parade Ground, Jolly's Boat House, and a number of Rowing Club boathouses.

Park 12 is home to the Peace Park,
Angas Gardens, 
Roberts Reserve, 
Grundy Gardens, 
the Cross of Sacrifice Garden, 
the South Australian Naval Memorial Garden, 
Lady Esther Lipman Gardens, 
Pioneer Women's Memorial Garden, 
Town Clerk’s Avenue/ Walk and 
the Pathway of Honour.

Buildings
Buildings in Park 12 North of Victoria Drive include:

University Footbridge

Located in the River Torrens portion of the Park, a dramatic cantilevered footbridge over the River Torrens of much picturesque charm and presence. Designed by the South Australian Railways department by engineers John Adrian Farghar and Reginald Bridgland with plans carrying the signature of the chief engineer of the Railways, Robert Hall Chapman. Construction of the footbridge proceeded with monies from the Council as part of its commitment to the state's centenary celebrations, and with a gift of £2,000 from Misses E and L Waite. The footbridge was opened on 9 August 1937. Currently listed as a State Heritage Place.

Formal parks, gardens and paths

Pathway of Honour
Located between Kintore Avenue and King William Road, adjacent to the northern Government House grounds wall. Consists of a narrow sliver of land with a partially curved pedestrian pathway with associated war memorial plaques and stones. It was a pedestrian route that evolved in the 1920s and was formalised in the 1980s to honour war fallen.

Town Clerk’s Avenue / Walk
An axial pedestrian pathway from Sir Edwin Smith Avenue and Angas Gardens, leading to Frome Road, it was developed c.1917 with tree planting and pathway formation.

Angas Gardens

Located east off King William Road between War Memorial Drive and the River Torrens, the gardens feature the JH & GF Angas Statue and Memorial by WR Cotton (1915),  and Robert Hannaford's statue of Simpson and his donkey. The gardens are named after South Australian pioneers and pastoralists John Howard Angas and George Fife Angas.

Roberts Place
Located on the corner of Frome Road and Sir Edwin Smith Avenue, and an original extension of McKinnon Terrace. A triangular portion of land originally conceived as a formal garden centred upon a mature Moreton Bay Fig tree. Named after retired American merchant and South Australia Colonization Commissioner Josiah Roberts.

Grundy Gardens
Located between Frome and King William Roads and War Memorial and Victoria Drives.

Pennington Gardens East
Located between King William Road, Pennington Terrace and Sir Edwin Smith Avenue. A triangular
shaped garden that was severely modified in 1919 onwards with the imposition of the Women’s War Memorial Garden. Named after South Australian Colonisation Commissioner James Pennington.

Women’s War Memorial Garden
Located within Pennington Gardens East, the Women’s War Memorial was designed by Walter Torode in 1922.  A formal rectangular configured 'Cross of Sacrifice' Garden reminiscent of a cathedral floor plan, designed by architect Alfred Wells and garden by Sir Herbert Baker. It includes the predominant use of low Olive hedging, Lavender, and Roses. The 11.6 metres (38 feet) high Cross of Sacrifice, designed by Sir Reginald Blomfield, at the north-west end is aligned to face the facade of  St Peter's Cathedral.  As a tribute, a scroll with the names of Adelaide's lost is enclosed within the base of  the cross.  The Remembrance Stone, designed by Sir Edwin Lutyens, is at the south-eastern end. The Cross was unveiled and Garden opened on 25 April 1922. The Stone was unveiled 25 April 1923. The Adelaide Anzac Day Commemorative March ends at this War Memorial. The Garden is currently listed as a State Heritage Place.

Pioneer Women’s Memorial Garden
Located in the Torrens Parade Ground portion between the Ground and the northern Government House grounds wall. A place identified and proposed in 1937 by the Women’s Council of South Australia as a venue to honour the pioneer women of South Australia, under a Committee chaired by Adelaide Miethke. Waikerie limestone statue sculptured by Olna Cohn and garden designed, planted and constructed by landscape designer Elsie Cornish in 1938. Statue unveiled 19 April 1941. Garden renovated by the Council in 2002. The Garden possesses associative significance to the foundation of the Royal Flying Doctor Service in Alice Spring. Currently listed as a State Heritage Place.

Heritage Rose Garden
Developed in 1995–1996 and re-developed in 2017-2018,for the WFR conference in 2021.It is located on the north bank of the River Torrens, the garden was designed by the
Heritage Roses in Australia, Adelaide group.

See also
List of Adelaide parks and gardens

Notes

References
 Community Land Management Plan (CLMP): Karrawirra (Park 12), Park Lands and Sustainability Business Unit, Adelaide City Council. Adopted by Adelaide City Council on 27 November 2006. (7Mb, 131 pages)

Parks in Adelaide